Ramón Regueira Ramos (7 January 1935 – 15 December 2021) was a Spanish professional footballer who played as a forward.

Career
Born in A Coruña, Regueira played for Xesuítas de Vigo, Deportivo Fabril, Deportivo de La Coruña, Caudal and Burgos. His football career ended when he was called up for military service, and he later became a businessman.

References

1935 births
2021 deaths
Spanish footballers
Deportivo Fabril players
Deportivo de La Coruña players
Caudal Deportivo footballers
Burgos CF (1936) footballers
Segunda División players
Association football forwards
20th-century Spanish businesspeople
Footballers from A Coruña